Mount Olivet Cemetery is a historical, non-denominational, pre-Civil War cemetery located in Hanover, Pennsylvania.  The cemetery, located at 725 Baltimore Street is operated by the Mount Olivet Cemetery Association. A volunteer group, The Friends of Mount Olivet Cemetery, provide support to the cemetery staff and local organizations when the cemetery host events.

History
Founded in 1859 as a non-profit, non-sectarian community cemetery governed by a Board of Managers who are elected each year and serve without remuneration. Management of cemetery grounds is by a Cemetery Manager, appointed by the Board of Managers, this manager is authorized to enforce all of the Cemetery's rules and regulations.

Notable burials
Joseph S. Gitt (1815-1901), civil engineer and railroad surveyor
Colonel Richard McAllister (1725-1795), founder of Hanover, Revolutionary War Veteran
Major William S. Diller (1842-1896), Civil War Veteran with Company D, 76th Regiment.
Mary Shaw Leader (1835-1913), female journalist reported on President Lincoln's Gettysburg Address
John Luther Long (1855-1927), lawyer, playwright, novelist; creator of the short story that was inspiration for 'Madame Butterfly. 
Colonel Henry Slagle (1735-1811), officer during the Revolutionary War, and upright citizen of Hanover
John and William Hoffacker, John was the first  local soldier to die on the first day of the Battle of Hanover, and brother William died later resulting from injuries obtained from the Civil War
Andrew R. Brodbeck (1860-1937), Politician, churchman, and businessman who served as U. S. Congressman between 1912-1914 and 1916-1918
Lucy Forney-Bittinger (1859-1955), Deaconess of Presbyterian Church, missionary, donor of the Forney-Bittinger Chapel at Mount Olivet Cemetery.

References

External links
Website

Cemeteries in Pennsylvania
Hanover, Pennsylvania